The Pretty Miller Girl (French: La Belle Meunière) is a 1949 French musical film directed by Marcel Pagnol and starring Tino Rossi, Jacqueline Pagnol and Raoul Marco. It is part of the tradition of operetta films. The title is a reference to Schubert's song cycle Die schöne Müllerin.

Synopsis
Composer Franz Schubert goes to the countryside to find inspiration. He meets a girl, Brigitte, near a windmill. However, the local lord wants her as his lover. Distraught, Schubert leaves and writes some new music to get over it.

The film was shot with Rouxcolor technology. The film's sets were designed by the art director Robert Giordani.

Cast
Tino Rossi as Franz Schubert
Jacqueline Pagnol as Brigitte
Raoul Marco as Maître Guillaume
 as the Countess
Raphaël Patorni as Count Christian
 as the Baroness
Suzanne Desprès as the lavender-girl
Roger Monteaux
Christian Bertola
Jean-Paul Coquelin
Pierrette Rossi
Gustave Hamilton
Edouard Hemme
Jules Dorpe

References

1949 films
Films directed by Marcel Pagnol
1940s French-language films
French black-and-white films
French historical musical films
Films based on songs
Films set in the 1820s
Films set in Austria
Films about classical music and musicians
Films about composers
Cultural depictions of Franz Schubert
1940s historical musical films
Operetta films
Gaumont Film Company films
1940s French films